Çerçiz Topulli (20 September 1880 – 17 July 1915) was an Albanian revolutionary and guerrilla fighter involved in the national movement operating in the mountainous areas of southern Albania. He was the younger brother of Bajo Topulli. He was known for fighting the Ottomans in 1907 and 1908 and then after they left, the Greeks in 1913 and 1914 during the Balkan Wars.

Biography
Çerçiz Topulli was a Muslim Tosk Albanian, scion of a notable family of Gjirokastra, born to Ago Topulli and Hasije, daughter of Laze Mullai from Kardhiq.

Armed resistance
During early 1906, he and his brother Bajo founded the first Albanian armed guerrilla band. The group was active for three years, with both brothers taking a winter break during 1906-1907 and spending it in Sofia and Bucharest. Both brothers had been professionals who decided to engage in guerilla warfare after leaving the comforts of town life. The guerilla band viewed the Ottoman regime of Abdul Hamid II along with Greeks and Slavs as the enemy.

In the spring of 1907, he and Mihal Grameno formed a band of guerrillas in Sofia to fight for Albanian interests. In April of that year, the band landed in Vlora, having entered the country from Brindisi. The purpose was to spread Albanian national consciousness among the people, including the immediate need for administrative autonomy for Albanians within the Ottoman Empire. They also brought books in Albanian for the people. He wrote an article "From the Mountains of Albania" in the journal "The Hope of Albania" in its issue. In that article he condemned the many thefts that the Turkish administration would commit towards the Albanians and asked for full independence of Albania. In the article he made calls for an armed insurgency. Soon campaigns of agitation were prepared so as to lead an armed uprising in 1908.

The armed bands of Çerçiz Topulli cooperated and were on good terms with armed groups of Bulgarian-Macedonian revolutionaries operating in the Lake Prespa region and Kastoria area, a bond formed due to their hostility toward Greeks.

On 25 February 1908, Çerçiz and his followers had assassinated the Ottoman Binbaşı (Lieutenant Colonel) of Gjirokastër, who had brutally suppressed those Albanians working for Albanian political ends. Five of them, including Çerçiz Topulli, then fled to Mashkullorë, a village near the town of Gjirokastër. On 18 March they were  surrounded in Mashkullorë by Ottoman forces from Yanya (modern Ioannina). The Ottoman force of 150 troops vastly outnumbered Çerçiz's kachaks. However, Topulli and his fighters managed to keep the Ottomans at bay from dawn until dusk and then fled into the mountains, an event which was later celebrated in folk ballads.

Young Turk Revolution (1908) and post revolution 
During the Young Turk Revolution (1908), Adjuntant Major Ahmed Niyazi Bey devoted his energies toward recruiting Çerçiz whom he regarded as "the Chief of the Tosk Committee of Albanians". Niyazi sent a letter to Topulli inviting him for a meeting to talk about conditions for a union  with the Young Turks (CUP).

Representatives from Topulli met with Niyazi in Korçë. Albanian delegates accused the Turks of lacking commitment to Ottomanism resulting in their struggle to defend themselves from foreigners and Ottomans while Niyazi replied that Turks made much effort toward promoting Ottomanism with the creation of the CUP being evidence of that endeavour. After the discussion Albanian delegates accepted the CUP invitation. All joined through an oath ceremony and were enrolled with promises to bring Topulli and other prominent Albanian committee members for a final meeting to talk about details of the agreement.

Hyrsev Starova Bey, a local Albanian notable and friend of Niyazi's father was tasked with arranging the meeting that was scheduled to occur in Pogradec. Hyrsev also contacted Hysen Baba, an Albanian Bektashi sheikh from the Melçan tekke who acted as mediator between Topulli and Niyazi that influenced the latter along with other brigand leaders to support the CUP cause. Niyazi viewed the meeting as mainly unimportant due to local Albanians already pledging allegiance to the CUP. During negotiations with Albanian committee members the significance of Albanian participation made Niyazi remark that "most of the leaders and partisans of [the movement for] constitutional administration were not Turkish". The Korçë Albanian committee lent support to Niyazi and at the request of the CUP called upon guerillas based in the mountains around Korçë to join Ottoman insurgent bands with the Ohri Albanian committee heeding the directive. Topulli was hard pressed by fellow Albanians to meet with Niyazi to talk about joint action and he arrived in Pogradec with his band on 21 July 1908. An oath of alliance was made by Topulli for the CUP cause. 

Ottoman documents depicted as the most important Albanian band being the group under Topulli's command consisting of 50 individuals, "Muslims and Bulgarians" while there is no clarity about if these Bulgarians belonged to the Internal Macedonian Revolutionary Organization (IMRO) or they just joined to fight Greek bands. Niyazi described that Albanian Tosk bands and Bulgarian bands had been united under Topulli in Ohri. Topulli's guerilla band gave important support to Niyazi and his forces during their capture of the Resne garrison and the event was a small military victory in the campaign to oust the Hamidian regime. During July 1908, Topulli attempted to take the town of Korçë, but his forces were pushed back by Ottoman troops. On 23 July Niyazi met with guerilla leaders Topulli and Mihal Grameno in Resne where he expressed his gratitude and viewed the declaration of the CUP constitution as advantageous for the Albanian nation. Topulli alongside Niyazi and Grameno appeared in photographs taken by the Manakis brothers during the revolution.

Individuals that were less prominent "heroes" of the revolution like Topulli had their image distributed through media tools of the time. For example on postcards Topulli appears in an image alongside Atıf Bey and Adem Bey symbolising the cooperation of different communal groups of people involved in the revolution.

When the Ottoman Young Turks took power, he organized patriotic societies and assisted in the opening of Albanian-language schools.  

During the 31 March Incident, among the 15,000 volunteers assisting the larger Ottoman army Topulli along with Bajram Curri mobilized 8,000 Albanians that put down the revolt in Istanbul.

On 29 May 1909, Çerçiz Topulli founded in Gjirokastër a secret society called Kandilja (The Candle), an underground çeta group.

Topulli, a former ally of the CUP commented that there was no further need "to shed a single drop of blood for the Turks anymore". He was of the view that Albanians were "one of the most perfect branches of the Caucasian races" and had no commonalities with an empire whose roots were from peoples originating from the Asian steppe.

After independence
After the proclamation of the independence of Albania on 28 November 1912 Topulli was also active in the defense of national interests after independence.

Topulli went to the north to help with the efforts against Montenegrin forces. He was killed in the Fusha e Shtoit (Shkodër) from the Montenegrin forces .

In 1937 his bones were brought back to Gjirokastër.

Quotations
Çerçiz Topulli subordinated religious differences and every other consideration to this goal of national liberation:
"Each Muslim has a duty to die for a Christian because he is blood of his blood; in the same way each Christian should die for a Muslim who is likewise blood of his own blood."

Topulli was a strong advocate against the Ottomans:
"We go with rifle in hand, out into the mountains, to seek freedom, justice, civilization and progress for all ... to expel the Turks from our dear Motherland."

References

Bibliography
 
 

1880 births
1915 deaths
People from Gjirokastër
People from Janina vilayet
Heroes of Albania
Albanian revolutionaries
Albanian military personnel
Activists of the Albanian National Awakening